Let's Get It: Thug Motivation 101 is the major label debut and overall third studio album by American rapper Young Jeezy. It was released on July 26, 2005, by his indie record label Corporate Thugz, under the distribution from Def Jam South. On the UK's album release, it features the remixed version of "Go Crazy", featuring guest appearance from rapper Jay-Z.

The album was supported by four singles: "And Then What" featuring Mannie Fresh, "Soul Survivor" featuring Akon, "Go Crazy" and "My Hood". The album debuted at number two on the Billboard 200, selling 172,000 copies in the first week. The album was certified double platinum by the Recording Industry Association of America (RIAA).

Critical reception 

In 2015, hip hop writer Brooklyn Russell declared the album "trap rap's apotheosis" while observing its impact: "Working with only a handful of Shawty Redd beats and his naturally raspy voice, Atlanta native Young Jeezy would lay down the blueprint for an entire region of rappers—virtually knocking big players like Lil Jon out of commission."

In 2012, Complex called the album one of the classic albums of the last decade.

Commercial performance 
Let's Get It: Thug Motivation 101 debuted at number two on the US Billboard 200, selling 172,000 copies in the first week. This became Jeezy's first US top-ten debut. In its second week, the album dropped to number four on the chart, selling an additional 85,000 copies. In its third week, the album dropped to number six on the chart, selling 71,000 more copies. In its fourth week, the album dropped to number ten on the chart, selling 61,000 copies. As of October 2009, the album sold 1,933,000 copies in the US. On July 2, 2020, the album was certified double platinum by the Recording Industry Association of America (RIAA) for combined sales and album-equivalent units of over two million units in the United States.

Track listing

Sample credits
 "Go Crazy" contains a sample of "(Man, Oh Man) I Want to Go Back" performed by Curtis Mayfield & The Impressions.
 "My Hood" contains an interpolation of "Rubberband Man" performed by T.I.
 "Talk to 'Em" contains a sample of "I Need You" performed by Frankie Beverly & Maze.

Charts

Weekly charts

Year-end charts

Certifications

References 

2005 debut albums
Albums produced by Drumma Boy
Albums produced by Jazze Pha
Albums produced by Mr. Collipark
Albums produced by Mannie Fresh
Albums produced by Shawty Redd
Def Jam Recordings albums
Jeezy albums
Albums produced by J.U.S.T.I.C.E. League
Albums produced by Don Cannon
Albums produced by Lil' C (record producer)